Pagiriai  is a small town in Kaunas County in central Lithuania. In 2011 it had a population of 358.

References

This article was initially translated from the Lithuanian Wikipedia.

Towns in Lithuania
Towns in Kaunas County
Vilkomirsky Uyezd
Kėdainiai District Municipality